Malacothamnus orbiculatus is a species of flowering plant in the mallow family known by the common names Tehachapi bushmallow and round-leaved bushmallow. It occurs in California, where it is common after burns on the desert-facing slopes of mountains, and Arizona, where it is currently only known from a few locations. Malacothamnus orbiculatus is occasionally treated within Malacothamnus fremontii.

References

External links
Calflora Profile: Malacothamnus orbiculatus
'' Photo gallery at Calphotos

Flora of California
Flora of Arizona
orbiculatus
Taxa named by Edward Lee Greene
Plants described in 1906
Flora without expected TNC conservation status